Senator Treat may refer to:

Greg Treat (born 1978), Oklahoma State Senate
Joseph B. Treat (1836–1919), Wisconsin State Senate
Sharon Treat (born 1956), Maine State Senate